Theraphosa is a genus of South American tarantulas that was first described by Charles Athanase Walckenaer in 1805. The Theraphosa spiders are some of the largest known to science, and are usually called Pinkfoot Goliaths in english.  it contains three species, found in Guyana, Brazil, Venezuela, and Colombia. They stridulate by rubbing setae on their pedipalps and legs.

Diagnostic 
Tarantulas of this genus are characterized by their large size, and the lack of long hairs in the patella and tibia sections of the legs. It can also be further distinguished by the presence of stridulating hairs on the prolateral coxae 1 and 2. Females also own a unique single spermatheca.

Behavior 
This tarantulas are found in holes in the ground, usually abandoned burrows, which they adopt and use as their own. They are usually found near rivers, and eat a great amount of invertebrates and very small vertebrates, such as small frogs and lizards.

Species 
 the World Spider Catalog has accepted the following 3 species:

 Theraphosa apophysis Tinter, 1991 - Colombia, Venezuela and Brazil
 Theraphosa blondi Latreille, 1804 - Venezuela, Brazil and Guyana  
 Theraphosa stirmi Rudloff & Weinmann, 2010 - Guyana and Brazil  

One species has been changed to the genus Sericopelma.

 Theraphosa panamanum Karsch, 1880 → Sericopelma panamanum

See also
 List of Theraphosidae species

References

External links
 Genus information

Theraphosidae genera
Spiders of South America
Taxa named by Tamerlan Thorell
Theraphosidae